Una parte di me is the third studio album of Amaury Vassili released on Warner Music France on 22 October 2012. It entered SNEP the official French Albums Chart at #11.

Vassili has incorporated in the album the best from the greatest classical composers such as Mozart, Chopin, Tchaikovsky and Brahms with a touch of pop opera.

The title song is the debut single from the album.

Track listing

Volume 2
DVD – Documentary and music clips

Charts

Release history

References

2012 albums
Amaury Vassili albums
Warner Music France albums